Werner Riebenbauer (born 7 July 1974) is an Austrian former road and track cyclist. He competed in the road race at the 1996 Summer Olympics and in the madison at the 2000 Summer Olympics. He won the Austrian National Road Race Championships in 2000. He also competed in two events at the 2010 UCI Track Cycling World Championships. He also rode in the 2003 Giro d'Italia, but did not finish.

Major results

2000
 1st  Road race, National Road Championships
2001
 1st Stage 1 Vuelta a Murcia
 1st Stage 1 Tour of Austria
 9th HEW Cyclassics
2003
 3rd G.P. Costa degli Etruschi
2004
 8th Raiffeisen Grand Prix
2005
 7th Overall Tour of Southland
 10th GP Jamp
2006
 3rd Raiffeisen Grand Prix
 4th Salzkammergut-Giro
2008
 10th Raiffeisen Grand Prix
2011
 4th Ljubljana–Zagreb
2012
 1st Stage 3 Okolo Slovenska
 7th Banja Luka–Belgrade I

References

External links
 
 
 
 
 
 

1974 births
Living people
Austrian track cyclists
Austrian male cyclists
Cyclists from Vienna
Cyclists at the 1996 Summer Olympics
Cyclists at the 2000 Summer Olympics
Olympic cyclists of Austria
20th-century Austrian people